Stronger is the 29th studio album by British singer Cliff Richard, released in October 1989. The album was produced by Alan Tarney and includes the singles "The Best of Me"(UK No. 2), "I Just Don't Have the Heart" (UK No. 3), "Lean on You" (UK No. 17) and "Stronger Than That" (UK No. 14). The album reached platinum, peaking at number 7 on the UK Albums Chart.

Track listing
 "Stronger Than That" (Alan Tarney) – 4:42
 "Who's in Love" (Alan Tarney) – 4:31
 "The Best of Me" (David Foster, Jeremy Lubbock, Richard Marx) – 4:11
 "Clear Blue Skies" (Dave Cooke, Chris Turner) – 2:54
 "Lean on You" (Alan Tarney) – (5:03)
 "Keep Me Warm" (Alan Tarney) – (4:24)
 "I Just Don't Have the Heart" (Stock, Aitken, Waterman) – 3:27
 "Joanna" (Chris Eaton) – 3:52
 "Everybody Knows" (Alan Tarney) – 3:48
 "Forever You Will Be Mine" (Alan Tarney) – 4:25
 "Better Day" (Alan Tarney) – 4:49
 "Share a Dream" (with Aswad) (Rod Trott, Jon Sweet, Richard Osborne) – 4:30

2004 remastered CD bonus tracks
"Wide Open Space" (Judith Walmsley, Martin Abbot) – 4:37
"I Just Don't Have the Heart" (Instrumental) – 4.00
"Hey Mister" (Alan Tarney) – 3:56
"Lindsay Jane" (Cliff Richard) – 4:44
"Marmaduke" (Trevor Spencer, Alan Tarney) – 5:28

Charts

Weekly charts

Year-end charts

Certifications

References

External links
 Cliff Richard's official website

1989 albums
Cliff Richard albums
Albums produced by Alan Tarney
Albums produced by Stock Aitken Waterman
EMI Records albums